Peninsula Engineering Group, Inc. (PEGI) was a United States company which was a pioneer in on-frequency microwave and cellular repeaters.  From its founding in 1983 until its demise in 2002, the company was a technological leader in the field of low-cost on-frequency repeaters, and was awarded numerous patents.  Peninsula Engineering Solutions, Inc. is a successor company that continues to provide both new products and parts based on the PEGI designs.  The company went through a few name changes; in 1992 it became "Peninsula Wireless Communications" and in 1995 again changed names to "Repeater Technologies."

PEGI's clients included telephone companies, mobile phone companies, utilities, governments, and other agencies around the world.  The company was based in the San Francisco Bay Area and had an office in Beijing, China.

History
Peninsula Engineering Group started in 1983.  The GTE Lenkurt facility in San Carlos, California, was going to be closed.  Product Planner (soon to be PEGI President) Barry Leff met with Microwave Engineering Manager (soon to be PEGI VP Engineering) Ed Johnson and discussed starting a company based on keeping the GTE Lenkurt microwave engineering team together in a new company.

The company was incorporated in 1983, located in San Carlos, California.  On the first day of business the company had no money, an order for $50,000 (from GTE), fifteen engineers, one business person and a secretary.  In addition to getting employees to work for stock for some months, they figured out a way to buy the complex test equipment needed to build sophisticated communications equipment.  GTE held an auction, and some employees took second mortgages on their homes to buy equipment at auction, which they then leased to the company.  When the company got on firmer financial footing, it bought the equipment from the employees.  The experiences they went through in financing the company served as inspiration for Barry Leff to explore the subject in greater detail; his doctoral dissertation at Golden Gate University was titled "Financing the Start-up of Silicon Valley High-Tech Companies".

The company's initial product was a version of the GTE Lenkurt 2 GHz RF Repeater, invented some years earlier by John Oades.  The repeater offered a low cost, efficient way to get around obstacles with a microwave link.

The company completed their first year of business with sales of over $700,000 and a small profit.  In April 1985 Barry and Ed met with New Vector Communications (later part of AirTouch.  New Vector agreed to fund the development of an 800 MHz on-frequency RF repeater, which led to PEGI getting into the cellular telephone business, their major focus.

Patents
 Split Band Filter for Cellular Mobile Radio, Patent Number 4783843.  Inventors Barry Leff, Ed Johnson, and Joseph Lutz. One of the earliest patents for a cellular repeater, issued November 1988.
 Apparatus and Method for Expanding Cellular System Capacity, Patent Number 5187806.  Inventors Ed Johnson and Barry Leff.  An early microcell patent, filed in 1990.

References

Companies based in San Francisco
Defunct engineering companies of the United States
Defunct manufacturing companies based in the San Francisco Bay Area
Technology companies based in the San Francisco Bay Area
1983 establishments in California
2002 disestablishments in California
American companies established in 1983
American companies disestablished in 2002